Combat Flight Simulator 3: Battle for Europe (CFS3), is the latest installment of combat flight simulators from Microsoft Game Studios, released on October 24, 2002 in North America and on November 15, 2002 in Europe for the Microsoft Windows.

Gameplay
The game is more or less a heavily updated version of the first (Microsoft Combat Flight Simulator), offering a far wider range of options to the player. The game incorporates an active campaign mode, whereby the player may play for the USAAF, RAF or Luftwaffe in a campaign starting in March 1943. Based on the player's performance in the North-west Europe, which spans from northernmost England to eastern Berlin, the player can alter the length and even outcome of the war. By avoiding the aviational errors of the Luftwaffe made in the past, and by targeting key targets in British production centres, it is even possible for the Germans to drive the allies back to London and force their surrender. It is also possible for the Allies to make a landing in Fortress Europe prior to the 6/6/44, or D-day. The multiplayer game allows players to occupy different stations on the same vehicle.

Reception
Combat Flight Simulator 3 received a "Silver" sales award from the Entertainment and Leisure Software Publishers Association (ELSPA), indicating sales of at least 100,000 copies in the United Kingdom.

Combat Flight Simulator 3 was a nominee for The Electric Playgrounds 2002 "Best Simulation for PC" award, but lost to MechWarrior 4: Mercenaries.

Combat Flight Simulator 3 garnered mixed reviews, and holds an average of 69/100 on aggregate web site Metacritic.

Add-on
Firepower is an expansion pack released in 2004, developed by Shockwave Productions and published by GMX Media and Tri Synergy. Firepower adds 18 new aircraft bringing the total of 36 military aircraft (or 56 with variants) to Combat Flight Simulator 3. Firepower also adds 50 new historical type missions, new ordnance and improved graphic effects.

The aircraft in Firepower include the B-17 Flying Fortress models F and G, B-29A Superfortress, Arado 234B Blitz, Dewoitine D.520 fighter, Dornier 217M medium bomber, Dornier 217N night fighter, He-162A Salamander, Me 334, Me410A Schnellbomber, Me410B-2 R-3 zerstorer, Me410B-2 U-2 R-4 zerstorer, Me410B-2 U-4 zerstorer, P-40N Warhawk, Ta-154 Moskito, Ta-152C1 R31, Ta-152H-1, Ta-183 Huckebein (Raven) Interceptor, Avro Lancaster Mk III heavy bomber, Ho-229 V5 Supersonic Fighter /bomber, Avro Lancaster GS heavy bomber, and a B-24J Liberator. Also there are 4 (or 5 with a free patch) new bombers in which the player can man different aircrew positions.

Player can use the bombsight to drop newly added ordnance onto a target like the Little Boy, Fat Man, German radiological dirty bombs or the Tallboy bomb. However some of these aircraft are hypothetical especially the German designs some of which never saw aerial combat during World War II. So is the German ordnance hypothetical as well. Another feature in this add on is that you can fly bombers in a formation, with FLAK effects when under enemy anti aircraft fire. Twenty-five missions of the Memphis Belle B-17 Flying Fortress are included in this add on. One thing that's lacking though is a sophisticated simulation of the Norden Bombsight which B-17 Flying Fortress the Mighty 8th has a decent representation of albeit not fully emulating the Norden computer, it's gyrostabilizer and ancillary equipment. Instead the Bombsight in Firepower is fixed but it is functional.

Firepower garnered generally positive reviews, and holds an average of 88/100 on aggregate web site Metacritic.

Notes

See also
IL-2 Sturmovik
Jane's Attack Squadron

External links
Combat Flight Simulator 3: Battle for Europe at MobyGames

2002 video games
Microsoft games
Multiplayer vehicle operation games
Video game sequels
Video games developed in the United States
Video games set in Europe
Video games with expansion packs
World War II flight simulation video games
Windows games
Windows-only games
Multiplayer and single-player video games